To the Treetops! is the first album by Norwegian indie band Team Me. It was released on October 14, 2011 on Propeller Records, in Norway, and was later released internationally on March 5. The album has been released digitally, and in CD and 2-LP format.

Track listing

Personnel

Team Me
 Marius Drogsås Hagen – vocals, guitar, piano
 Synne Øverland Knudsen – vocals, piano
 Simen Sandbæk Skari – backing vocals, piano
 Simen Schikulski – backing vocals, bass guitar
 Uno Møller Christiansen – backing vocals, guitar, drums
 Bjarne Alexander Ryen Berg – drums

Additional musicians
 Anders Magnor Killerud – backing vocals
 Annar By – backing vocals
 Herman Hulleberg – backing vocals
 Emilie Riddle – cello
 Julie Ofelia Østrem Ossum – cello
 Per Egil Knudsen – Flute
 Lars Bæk – backing vocals and percussion
 Yngve Hornsletten – backing vocals and percussion
 Tyge Møller Christiansen – percussion and noises
 Peder Jørgensen – vocals, piano, percussion
 Ingvild Nordstoga Eide – viola
 Daniel Lyngstad – violin
 Åsa Ree – violin
 Jeanette M. Larsen – vocals

References

External links
 Team Me's official website

Team Me albums
2011 albums